The Department of Family and Community Services (also known as FaCS) was an Australian government department that existed between October 1998 and January 2006.

Scope
Information about the department's functions and/or government funding allocation could be found in the Administrative Arrangements Orders, the annual Portfolio Budget Statements, the Department's annual reports and on the Department's website.

According to the Administrative Arrangements Order (AAO) made on 21 October 1998, the Department dealt with:
Income security policies and programs
Services for people with disabilities and families with children
Community support services, excluding the Home and Community Care program
Family relationship services
Welfare housing

Structure
The Department was an Australian Public Service department, staffed by officials who were responsible to the Minister.

The Secretary of the Department was David Rosalky, until 2001 and then subsequently Mark Sullivan, until 2004 and then Jeff Harmer.

References

Ministries established in 1998
Family and Community Services
Social security in Australia